Neeworra is a locality on the Mungindi railway line in north-western New South Wales, Australia. It was the site of a railway station between 1914 and 1975. The railway line has now closed through this location.

References

Towns in New South Wales